Mitrovac may refer to:

 Mitrovac, Serbia, a village near Bajina Bašta, Serbia
 Mitrovac, Osijek-Baranja County, a village near Čeminac, Croatia
 Mitrovac, Požega-Slavonia County, a village near Kutjevo, Croatia